Debra Conrad (born November 19, 1951) is an American politician who has served in the North Carolina House of Representatives from the 74th district since 2013.

Electoral history

2018

2016

2014

2012

References

1951 births
Living people
People from Forsyth County, North Carolina
Republican Party members of the North Carolina House of Representatives
Women state legislators in North Carolina
21st-century American politicians
21st-century American women politicians